The 2004 United States House of Representatives elections in Mississippi were held on Tuesday, November 2, 2004 and elected the four U.S. Representatives from the state of Mississippi. The elections coincided with the elections of other federal and state offices, including a quadrennial presidential election.

Overview

District 1
Republican Roger Wicker, who had represented Mississippi's 1st congressional district since 1994, easily ran for re-election with his only opposition being one third party candidate as the Democrats did not field a candidate.

General election

Results

District 2
Democrat Bennie Thompson, who had represented Mississippi's 2nd congressional district since 1993, was running for re-election. Thompson faced no opposition in the primary, but would face Clinton LeSueur in the general.

Democratic primary

Primary results

Republican primary

Primary results

General election

Results

District 3
Republican Chip Pickering, who had represented Mississippi's 1st congressional district since 1996, easily ran for re-election with his only opposition being two third party candidates as the Democrats did not field a candidate.

General election

Results

District 4
Democrat Gene Taylor, who had represented Mississippi's 3rd congressional district since 1989, was running for re-election. Thompson faced no opposition in the primary, but would face State Representative Michael Lott in the general.

Democratic primary

Primary results

Republican primary

Primary results

General election

Results

References

2004
Mississippi
United States House of Representatives